MLF may refer to:

Organizations
 Macina Liberation Front, a militant Islamist group that operates in Mali
 Major League Fishing, a professional bass fishing league and television show
 Major League Futsal, a futsal league in the United States
 Mission laïque française, a non-profit organization
 Mouvement de libération des femmes, a French feminist movement
 Mutant Liberation Front, a fictional supervillain group appearing in American comic books published by Marvel Comics

Other
 Malolactic fermentation, a process in winemaking in which tart-tasting malic acid is converted to softer-tasting lactic acid
 Medial longitudinal fasciculus, one of a pair of crossed over tracts, on each side of the brainstem
 Micro-leadframe, a type of connection between integrated circuits and printed circuit boards
 Multilateral Force, an American proposal for a fleet of submarines and warships, crewed by NATO personnel, and armed with nuclear missiles